is a fighting video game for the Nintendo DS based on the Dragon Ball franchise. It was released in Japan on February 3, 2011. 

It is the fifth installment in the Butōden series; the first to be released since 1995's Dragon Ball Z: Shin Butōden; and the first to be based on the Dragon Ball Kai anime series, itself a revised cut of the 1989 Dragon Ball Z anime that the previous installments were based on. 

The game would be followed by Dragon Ball Z: Extreme Butōden in 2015.

Gameplay
Ultimate Butōden'''s story mode covers events from the beginning of the Saiyan arc to the end of the Majin Buu arc, despite the latter arc being absent from the 2009 Kai series.

 Development 
News of the game first broke when it was announced that distributor Namco Bandai had applied for patents in Japan for two titles, Ultimate Butouden and Zenkai Battle Royale. The full announcement was featured in the following issue of Weekly Shōnen Jump, stating that the game would be released for the Nintendo DS in Japan on February 3 of the following year. Official screenshots suggested that the game would have 3D graphics, and a story mode that would cover events up until the Cell Saga. In the December issue of V Jump'' featured more screenshots of the gameplay and touch screen menu, showing that players can execute signature attacks by tapping the stylus.

Reception
The game sold 31,108 copies within its first week of release in Japan.
In the second week it managed to sell 10,341 copies.

References

Notes

External links 

 

2011 video games
Bandai games
Ultimate Butoden
Fighting games
Game Republic games
Japan-exclusive video games
Nintendo DS games
Nintendo DS-only games
Video games developed in Japan